The Land Registration Act 2002 (c 9) is an Act of the Parliament of the United Kingdom which repealed and replaced previous legislation governing land registration, in particular the Land Registration Act 1925, which governed an earlier, though similar, system. The Act, together with the Land Registration Rules, regulates the role and practice of HM Land Registry.

Background

The Land Registration Act 2002 was introduced in response to the Law Commission and HM Land Registry report, Land Registration for the Twenty-first Century (2001). The Act:
Simplified and modernised the law of land registration;
Made the register reflect a more accurate picture of a title to land, showing more fully the rights and subsidiary interests that affect it; and
Was intended to facilitate the introduction of e-conveyancing.

The Act made some major changes to the law regulating registered land. Specifically, it:
Enabled shorter leases to be registered;
Further encouraged voluntary land registration;
Changed the system of protection of third party rights; and
Reformed and modernised the law of adverse possession (squatters' rights).
Repealed the Land Transfer Act 1875
Repealed the Land Registration Act 1925

Land registration
Section 4 stipulates that registration of an estate in land is compulsory when one of the following events occurs:
Freehold estate is transferred, whether under a sale, gift or other circumstances;
Legal lease for more than seven years is granted;
Legal lease with more than seven years to run is transferred; or
Grant of a first legal charge (mortgage).

Failure to register when required, means that the purchaser or transferee gains only an equitable title to the land and the seller or  remains as the registered proprietor. A person with an equitable title, i.e. who has failed to register, cannot take advantage of the priority rules found in sections 29 and 30 of the Act and may be vulnerable if the (still) registered proprietor attempts another dealing with the land.

Grades of title
On first registration, the registrar awards a grade of title to each registered estate.

In the case of freehold estates, one of the following grades of title may be awarded according to s. 11 of the Act:
Absolute title – This shows there is nothing dubious about the title. The estate is vested in the proprietor and is subject only to entries on the register and unregistered interests which override (commonly called an overriding interest). Title does not have to be perfect – if the registrar believes that any defect will "not cause the holding under the title to be disturbed", absolute title will be given – s.9(3) LRA.
Possessory freehold title – there is no documentary evidence of title (e.g. lost title deeds). Title depends on adverse possession. It conveys no guarantee of title at the time of registration, but subsequent problems (e.g. forgery of proprietor's signature) will be covered by the guarantee. It can be upgraded into absolute title after being in possession as proprietor for 12 years (s.62(1), (4)).
Qualified freehold title – the title is subject to a fundamental defect. There is no guarantee in respect of the specified defect. It may be upgraded to absolute title if registrar is satisfied as to the title – s.62 LRA.

In the case of leasehold estates, one of the following grades of title may be awarded according to s. 12 of the Act:
Absolute leasehold title – same as absolute freehold except the proprietor is also subject to covenants in the lease
Good leasehold title – same as absolute leasehold except the right of the landlord to grant the lease is not guaranteed
Possessory leasehold title – same as possessory freehold
Qualified leasehold title – same as qualified freehold

Registerable dispositions
These are proprietary rights which are only legal if registered. Dispositions subject to registration according to s. 27 are:
any transfer of a freehold, whether for value or by way of gift or on death
the grant of a legal lease for more than seven years
the grant of a legal lease taking effect in possession in three or more months from grant
the grant of a legal charge (a mortgage)
the express grant of  legal easement

According to s. 27(1): "If a disposition is required to be completed by registration it does not operate at law until the relevant requirements are met."

Priority
According to s. 29 of the Act, a person acquiring an interest under a registrable disposition for valuable consideration (being usually a freehold or leasehold, but also including a legal mortgage) and having been registered successfully as owner of the interest, takes it subject to only:
an entry on the register, mainly a Notice in the charges register
unregistered interests which override (overriding interests)
interests excepted from the effects of registration (a category now otiose)
and if the estate is a lease, to burdens incidental to the lease

All other interests are postponed to the interest under the disposition – i.e. the successfully registered purchaser's interest gets priority over all other interests.

Note: if the transferee is not a purchaser (such as the recipient of a gift, or under a will), he or she takes the title subject to all pre-existing proprietary interests affecting the land – see s.28 LRA 2002

Restrictions
A restriction on the proprietorship register prevents the registration of a disposition unless complied with.

This is the appropriate way of alerting a purchaser of the existence of an equitable family interest which arises under a trust of land. A restriction does not protect the priority of that interest, nor any right of occupation – it notifies the purchaser of the interest. In any event, in the normal case, the purchaser will overreach and in such cases it is immaterial whether the purchaser knows of the equitable family interest or not. (Law of Property Act 1925; Trusts of Land and Appointment of Trustees Act 1996)

Restrictions are also useful to control dealings with the land as a secondary means of protection. For example, a person with an option to purchase land (e.g. a developer) should protect that interest by means of a Notice. However, they may also enter a restriction to prevent, or to be alerted to, any attempt to transfer the land in breach of the option.

Notices
According to s. 32 of the Act: "A notice is an entry on the [charges] register in respect of a burden of an interest affecting a registered estate or charge."

According to s. 33, the following interests cannot be protected by a notice:
the interest of a beneficiary under a trust of land
a lease granted for less than three years
restrictive covenants in a lease
and certain other minor property rights.

In all cases, these interests are protected against a purchaser by other means.

According to s. 34, all other interests may be protected by a notice. Examples include:
equitable easements
freehold restrictive covenants
equitable leases
estate contracts, including options to purchase and rights of pre-emption.

Adverse possession
The Act is known for the changes it has made to the rules regulating adverse possession in relation to registered land (the rules applicable to unregistered land remain the same, and 12 years possession is still required to obtain title).

The Act provides that anyone who occupies registered land without permission from the owner and treats it as his own for 10 years is entitled to apply to be registered as owner, although the system introduced by the Act means that few claims will succeed. Specifically, according to paragraph 1(1) of Schedule 6 to the Act:

A person may apply to the registrar to be registered as the proprietor of a registered estate in land if he has been in adverse possession of the estate for the period of ten years ending on the date of the application.

The Land Registry is obliged to notify the registered proprietor of the land that an application for possessory title has been made. The registered proprietor then has 65 business days to object to the registration. The objection may dispute the applicant's right to be registered as owner or, more usually, the registered proprietor will claim the benefit of the process found in paragraph 5 of Schedule 6. This provides that a registered proprietor who objects has a further two years to evict the adverse possessor. It will be enough to secure eviction within these two years that the registered proprietor relies on their registered title. No other reason need be given.   Failure to secure the eviction of the adverse possessor within these two years gives the adverse possessor the right to re-apply to be registered and such a second application will be successful.

In three special cases, the adverse possessor may be registered as proprietor without having to wait for two further years and even if the proprietor objects. These special cases usually arise because the adverse possessor has some other reason for claiming ownership in addition to their possession for (at least) 10 years.

The new rules regulating adverse possession can be found in Part 9 of the Act, and the rules regulating the procedures for registration of an adverse possessor can be found at Schedule 6 to the Act.

These rules are much more difficult to satisfy than the common law with regard to adverse possession, although it is now clear that all rules of adverse possession (in unregistered land, under the LRA 1925 and under the LRA 2002) are human rights compliant, see generally the judgment of the Grand Chamber of the European Court of Human Rights in J. A. Pye (Oxford) Ltd and Another v United Kingdom. Cobb and Fox's article argues that the 2002 Act unjustly favours landowners in claims of adverse possession (through paragraphs 2 and 3 of Schedule 6), whilst overlooking the moral issues surrounding squatting. The reform brought by the 2002 Act holds the view that intentional squatting "...at least in some cases, is tantamount to sanctioning a theft of land'". Meanwhile, the registered proprietor is deemed 'blameless' even where the property has been forgotten, with the 2002 Act "...designed to protect registered proprietors from the possibility of such oversight or inadvertence". Therefore, Cobb and Fox have argued the current law overlooks the moral justifications of adverse possession, such as increasingly unaffordable housing and to prevent 'stagnating land', instead enforcing the view that "advertent squatters are morally blameworthy" for their intentional trespassing, "while landowners are morally blameless".

A registered proprietor need simply object and then proceed to evict within two years. The adverse possessor's claim is therefore vulnerable under the 2002 Act and the registered proprietor is protected in all but the most unusual circumstances.

After the passage of the Act, local councils and other organisations with large land holdings began the systematic registration of their land in order to prevent title being lost to squatters.

Objection and adjudication
Anybody may make an objection to the Registrar about an application (s.73). The Registrar must advise the applicant and, so long as the objection is not groundless, must dispose of the objection by agreement between the parties. If agreement cannot be reached, the matter must be referred to the Land Registration Division, Property Chamber, First Tier Tribunal (formerly called the Adjudicator to HM Land Registry) who is appointed by the Lord Chancellor (ss.107–114). The Tribunal also hears appeals from aggrieved persons on decisions of the Registrar as to access to the Land Registry Network (Sch.5).

The Tribunal can make any order which the High Court could make for the rectification or setting aside of certain dispositions, contracts and other documents affecting interests in land. Appeals from the decision of the Regulator can be made to the High Court (s.111).

See also

English land law

Notes

References

Law Commission & HM Land Registry (2001) Land Registration for the Twenty-first Century – A Conveyancing Revolution, London: The Stationery Office

United Kingdom Acts of Parliament 2002
Acts of the Parliament of the United Kingdom concerning England and Wales
English property law
Housing legislation in the United Kingdom
Land registration